Gary McGraw is an American computer scientist, author, and researcher.

Education 
McGraw holds a dual PhD in Cognitive Science and Computer Science from Indiana University and a BA in Philosophy from the University of Virginia. His doctoral dissertation is titled "Letter Spirit: Emergent High-Level Perception of Letters Using Fluid Concepts."

Career 
McGraw was the Vice President of Security Technology at Synopsys. Before Cigital was acquired by Synopsys, he was Chief Technical Officer at Cigital. He produced the Silver Bullet Security Podcast for IEEE Security & Privacy magazine (syndicated by informIT). 
  Gary McGraw serves on the Dean's Advisory Council for the School of Informatics of Indiana University. He also serves on the advisory boards of several companies, including Dasient (acquired by Twitter), Fortify Software (acquired by Hewlett-Packard), Max Financial, Invotas, Wall+Main, Invincea (acquired by Sophos), and Raven White. In the past, Gary McGraw has served on the IEEE Computer Society Board of Governors.

Books
Gary is an author of many books and over 100 peer-reviewed publications on IT security.
 Software Security: Building Security In, 
 Exploiting Software: How to Break Code (with Greg Hoglund), 
 Building Secure Software: How to Avoid Security Problems the Right Way (with John Viega), 
 Java Security (with Edward Felten), 
 Exploiting Online Games: Cheating Massively Distributed Systems (with Greg Hoglund), 
 Software Security Engineering: A Guide for Project Managers (with Julia H. Allen, Sean J. Barnum, Robert J. Ellison, and Nancy R. Mead) 
 Software Fault Injection (with Jeffrey M. Voas) 
 Securing Java: Getting Down to Business with Mobile Code (with Edward Felten),

Notes

References
Ben Rothke. "Software Security: Building Security In", Security Management magazine
Radu State. Review of "Software Security: Building Security In by Gary McGraw", ACM Queue 4(7):44 (2006)
"Software Security : Building Security In", Palizine, Issue #18 February 2006
Robert Bruen. "Software Security. Building Security In", Cipher (IEEE magazine), Jan 5, 2006 
Alen Prodan. "Exploiting Software: How to Break Code", Help Net Security, 21 July 2004
A. Mariën. Review of "Exploiting Software: How to Break Code by Greg Hoglund and Gary McGraw", ACM Queue, 3(4):60 (2005) 
Robert Bruen. "Exploiting Software. How to Break Code", Cipher (IEEE magazine), January 13, 2004 
Aleksandar Stancin. "Building Secure Software: How to Avoid Security Problems the Right Way", Help Net Security
Robert Bruen. "Building Secure Software. How to Avoid Security Problems the Right Way", Cipher (IEEE magazine), January 9, 2002 
Diomidis Spinellis. "Book review: Building Secure Software: how to Avoid Security Problems the Right Way", ACM Computing Reviews, 43(4):103–104, April 2002.

External links
 Gary McGraw's personal home page

1966 births
Living people
American technology writers
Writers about computer security
Indiana University alumni
University of Virginia alumni